Pasquale Vivolo (6 January 1928 – 18 November 2002) was an Italian professional footballer who played as a striker.

Honours

Club
Juventus
 Serie A champion: 1949–50, 1951–52.

International
 Represented Italy at the 1952 Summer Olympics.

References

External links
 

1928 births
2002 deaths
Italian footballers
Italy international footballers
Serie A players
Serie B players
U.S. Cremonese players
Juventus F.C. players
S.S. Lazio players
Brescia Calcio players
Olympic footballers of Italy
Footballers at the 1952 Summer Olympics
Association football forwards